Warren "Wow" Jones (born 2 November 1953) is a former Australian rules footballer who played with Carlton and St Kilda in the Victorian Football League (VFL).

New Zealand born Jones was a 200 cm ruckman and was recruited to Carlton from Morningside. For most of his time at Carlton he was their second choice ruckman with Mike Fitzpatrick being their first choice, meaning that Jones often started games on the bench including in their 1982 premiership team. He later suffered from a bout of glandular fever which stalled his career and in 1986 he crossed to St Kilda where he played for three more years.

External links

1953 births
Living people
VFL/AFL players born outside Australia
Carlton Football Club players
Carlton Football Club Premiership players
St Kilda Football Club players
Brunswick Football Club players
Morningside Australian Football Club players
Castlemaine Football Club players
New Zealand players of Australian rules football
Australian rules footballers from Queensland
New Zealand emigrants to Australia
One-time VFL/AFL Premiership players